Daniel Queipo Menéndez (born 22 May 2002) is a Spanish professional footballer who plays as a left winger for Sporting B.

Club career
Born in Oviedo, Asturias, Queipo joined Sporting de Gijón's Mareo from Xeitosa CF. He made his senior debut with the reserves on 31 October 2020, coming on as a late substitute for Berto González in a 1–0 Segunda División B home win over CD Numancia.

On 22 June 2021, Queipo renewed his contract with Sporting and was definitely promoted to the B-team, now in Tercera División RFEF. He scored his first senior goal on 17 October, scoring the B's third in a 5–0 home routing over CD Tuilla.

Queipo made his first team debut on 13 August 2022, starting in a 1–1 away draw against CD Mirandés in Segunda División.

References

External links

2002 births
Living people
Footballers from Oviedo
Spanish footballers
Association football wingers
Segunda División players
Segunda División B players
Tercera Federación players
Sporting de Gijón B players
Sporting de Gijón players